Halmerend railway station (sometimes referred to as Halmer End) is a disused railway station in Staffordshire, England.

The station was situated on the North Staffordshire Railway (NSR) Audley branch line. The line opened in 1870 but passenger services were not introduced until 1880, partially a wait caused by the need to build a junction from the Audley line that would allow trains to run directly towards Stoke rather than having to reverse at the junction which was how the line was originally constructed.

The decision to introduce passenger trains over the line led to the opening of a station to serve the mining village of Halmer End in June 1880.

Good as the passenger service was the rise in bus services led to a decline in the revenue raised from passengers and in 1931 the London, Midland and Scottish Railway withdrew all passenger services on the Audley line from 27 April 1931.

Freight traffic too had been diminished by the economic depression towards the end of the 1920s and many of the local collieries closed as they became worked out or uneconomic to maintain and the line was reduced to a single line in 1933  although freight services continued until complete closure of the line through Halmerend in June 1962.

References
Notes

Sources

Further reading

Disused railway stations in Staffordshire
Former North Staffordshire Railway stations
Railway stations in Great Britain closed in 1931
Railway stations in Great Britain opened in 1880